Thomas Langton was a churchman.

Thomas Langton may also refer to:

Thomas Langton (died 1605), MP for Newton (UK Parliament constituency)
Thomas Langton (died 1569), MP for Lancashire
Thomas Langton Church